Sir Guy Palmes (1580–1653) was an English landowner and politician who sat in the House of Commons at various times between 1614 and 1643.

Early life 

Palmes was the son of Francis Palmes of Lindley, now part of Huddersfield, and at Ashwell, Rutland and married Anne, the daughter of Sir Edward Stafford. He was a member of the Palmes family.

Political positions 
Palmes had earlier been appointed a Deputy Lieutenant of Rutland by King James I and was a Justice of the Peace for Yorkshire. Palmes represented Rutland seven times in Parliament from 1614 until disabled from sitting in September 1643. He was High Sheriff of Yorkshire for 1622.

Palmes opposed the initiatives of King Charles I. He apparently later had a change of heart and became ardently Royalist.  He would be fined heavily by Parliament and eventually pardoned, but only after being forced to sell many of his estates to pay his fines.

A will dated 31 October 1519 of his ancestor Bryan Palmes, Sergeant-at-Law still exists, showing he had lands in Naburn, Riccall, Escrick, South Duffield, Elvington, Barthorpe, Sutton, Holtby, Berrythorpe and Gate Fulford.

Personal life 

Palmes' daughter Anne was the second wife of Robert Sutton, 1st Baron Lexinton of Aram, who was elevated to the peerage in 1645 for his services to the Royalist cause. 

Palmes was named a beneficiary and supervisor to the 1613 will of his cousin John Lindley of Lindley. The other supervisor of Lindley's will was Thomas Levett, married to Lindley's only daughter Margaret.

References

Oxford Dictionary of National Biography Simon Healy, Palmes, Sir Guy (1580–1653), first published September 2004, 1550 words

External links
Sir Guy Palmes, The Parliament of 1626
Sir Guy Palmes, A Genealogical and Heraldic History of the Commoners of Great Britain, John Burke, 1835
Appointment of Palmes in Rutland, Record Office Catalog, Leicestershire County Council
Parliament of 1640, British History Online
Parliament of 1642, British History Online
Guy Palmes, GENUKI
Guy Palmes, An Impartial Examination of the Third Volume of Mr. Daniel Neal's History of the Puritans, Zachary Grey, 1737
Guy Palmes Ashland, Rutland, British History Online
Parliamentary Pardon of Guy Palmes, British History Online
Palmes-Lindley family memorial, Otley, Yorkshire, Flickr.com
Palmes-Lindley family memorial, Otley, Yorkshire, Flickr.com
Palmes-Lindley family memorial, Otley, Yorkshire, Flickr.com

1580 births
1653 deaths
People from Huddersfield
High Sheriffs of Rutland
High Sheriffs of Yorkshire
English MPs 1614
English MPs 1621–1622
English MPs 1624–1625
English MPs 1625
English MPs 1628–1629
English MPs 1640 (April)
English MPs 1640–1648
Oxford Parliaments